Le Réveil du Tadla ("The Awakening of Tadla") was a French-language weekly newspaper published from Kasba Tadla, Morocco. The newspaper was founded in 1929. Its director was Louis Pouch and its editor-in-chief was Gaston Plateau.

References

1929 establishments in Morocco
Defunct newspapers published in Morocco
Defunct weekly newspapers
French-language newspapers published in Morocco
Newspapers published in Morocco
Publications established in 1929
Publications with year of disestablishment missing